Gérard Henri Grisey (17 June 1946 – 11 November 1998) was a twentieth-century French composer of contemporary classical music. His work is often associated with the Spectralist Movement in music, of which he was a major pioneer.

Biography
Grisey was born in Belfort, on 17 June 1946. From a very young age, Grisey demonstrated enormous interest and talent in music composition and study, writing his first essay on music when he was 9 years old. He won prizes for piano accompaniment, harmony, counterpoint, fugue, and composition at the Conservatoire under Messiaen's guidance. Other studies were undertaken in the summer of 1969 at the Accademia Chigiana in Siena.

Grisey won the Prix de Rome, enabling him to stay at the Villa Medici in Rome from 1972 to 1974. While there he became friends with Tristan Murail, with whom he founded the group L'Itinéraire in 1973 along with Roger Tessier and Michaël Lévinas, later to be joined by Hugues Dufourt. In 1974–75, he studied acoustics with Émile Leipp at the Paris VI University, and in 1980 became a trainee at the IRCAM (Institut de recherche et coordination acoustique/musique) in the computer music course organized by David Wessel and Marc Battier. During the same year, Grisey went to Berlin as a guest of the D.A.A.D. (Berliner Künstlerprogramm des DAAD) program. He subsequently left for the University of California, Berkeley, where he was appointed professor of theory and composition for the years 1982 to 1985 or until 1986. After returning to Europe, he took up the role of professor of orchestration and composition at the Conservatoire de Paris from 1987 until his death, while also holding numerous composition seminars in France (Centre Acanthes, Lyon, Paris) and abroad (Darmstadt, Freiburg, Milan, Reggio Emilia, Oslo, Helsinki, Malmö, Göteborg, Los Angeles, Stanford, London, Moscow, Madrid, etc.) For notable pupils 

Gérard Grisey died at the age of 52 in Paris on 11 November 1998 due to a ruptured aneurysm.

Musical style
Grisey's music is often considered to belong to the genre of spectral music, which he is credited with founding along with fellow composer Tristan Murail, although he later disowned the label in interviews and writings. According to British journalist Tom Service, "His achievement has often been reduced to yet another of new music's fetishistic labels, 'spectralism' – a category that Grisey had rejected by the end of his life." 

Nonetheless, he spent much of his career exploring the spectrum of tone colour between harmonic overtones and noise. In addition, he was fascinated by musical processes which unfold slowly, and he made musical time a major element of many of his pieces. He expressed the opinion that: "We are musicians and our model is sound not literature, sound not mathematics, sound not theatre, visual arts, quantum physics, geology, astrology or acupuncture."

Works (chronological)

 Passacaglia Pour Madame Darrow, for accordion (1966)
 Échanges, for prepared piano and double bass (1968)
 Mégalithes, for 15 brass players (1969)
 Charme, for clarinet solo (1969)
 Perichoresis, for 3 instrumental groups (1969–1970)
 Initiation, for baritone, trombone, and double bass (1970)
 Vagues, chemins, le souffle, for clarinet and orchestra (1970–72)
 D'eau et de pierre, for 2 instrumental groups (1972)
 Dérives, for 2 orchestral groups (1973–74)
 Les espaces acoustiques – II – Périodes, for flute, clarinet, trombone, violin, viola, cello, and double bass (1974)
 Les espaces acoustiques – III – Partiels, for 18 musicians (1975)
 Manifestations, for youth orchestra (1976)
 Les espaces acoustiques – I – Prologue, for viola and optional live electronics (1976)
 Les espaces acoustiques – IV – Modulations, for orchestra (1976–77)
 Sortie vers la lumière du jour, for electric organ and 14 musicians (1978)
 Jour, contre-jour, for electric organ, 14 musicians, and tape (1978–79)
 Tempus ex machina, for 6 percussionists (1979)
 Les espaces acoustiques – V – Transitoires, for large orchestra (1980)
 Solo pour deux, for clarinet and trombone (1981)
 Anubis-Nout, for Bb contrabass clarinet (1983) recorded by Ernesto Molinari, Fie Schouten, Carl Rosman
 Les chants de l'amour, for 12 voices and tape (1982–1984)
 Les espaces acoustiques – VI – Epilogue, for 4 solo horns and large orchestra (1985)
 Talea, for violin, cello, flute, clarinet, and piano (1986)
 Le temps et l'écume, for 4 percussionists, 2 synthesizers, and chamber orchestra (1988–89)
 Accords perdus: Cinq miniatures, for 2 horns (1989)
 Le noir de l'étoile, for 6 percussionists, tape, and live electronics (1989–90)
 Anubis et Nout, for bass saxophone or baritone saxophone (1990)
 L'icône paradoxale (Hommage à Piero della Francesca), for 2 female voices and 2 orchestral groups (1992–94)
 Stèle, for 2 percussionists (1995)
 Vortex temporum, for piano, clarinet (bass, Bb and A), flute (bass, C and picc.), violin, viola and cello (1994–96)
 Quatre chants pour franchir le seuil, for soprano and fifteen instruments (1997–98)

References

Sources

Further reading
 Arrell, Chris. 2002. "Pushing the Envelope: Art and Science in the Music of Gérard Grisey". Doctoral diss. Ithaca: Cornell University.
 Arrell, Chris. 2008. "The Music of Sound: An Analysis of Gérard Grisey's Partiels". In Spectral World Musics: Proceedings of the Istanbul Spectral Music Conference, edited by Robert Reigle and Paul Whitehead, (pp. 318–332). Istanbul: Pan Yayincilik. .
 Baillet, Jérôme. 2000. "Gérard Grisey, Fondements d'une écriture". Paris: L'Harmattan.
 Cohen-Levinas, Danièle (ed). 2004. "Gérard Grisey ou la beauté des ombres sonores. Paris: L'Harmattan / L'itinéraire.
 Grisey, Gérard. 2008. "Écrits ou l'invention de la musique spectrale", edited by Guy Lelong and Anne-Marie Réby. Répercussions. Paris: Musica Falsa. .
 Grisey, Gérard, and Tristan Murail. 1989. Entretemps, No. 8..
 Hervé, Jean-Luc. 2001. "Dans le vertige de la durée (Vortex Temporum de Gérard Grisey)", Paris: L'Harmattan.
 Levy, Fabien. 2001. "Gérard Grisey, eine neue Grammatologie aus dem Phänomen des Klangs" [Gérard Grisey, a New Grammatology from the Phenomenon of Sound]. In 20 Jahre Inventionen Berliner Festival Neuer Musik, edited by I. Beirer/DAAD, Berlin: Pfau Verlag.

External links
 Biography and list of compositions, Casa Ricordi
 Interview with Grisey
 Excerpts from sound archives of Grisey's works

1946 births
1998 deaths
Musicians from Belfort
20th-century classical composers
French classical composers
French male classical composers
Microtonal composers
École Normale de Musique de Paris alumni
Academic staff of the Conservatoire de Paris
University of California, Berkeley faculty
Pupils of Henri Dutilleux
Pupils of Karlheinz Stockhausen
20th-century French composers
20th-century French male musicians